Three Chords and the Truth is the third studio album of  The Ducky Boys. It was recorded and released in 2004. The group reverted to a three piece band with a big, professional recorded sound for the album. This is the Ducky Boy's second album with Thorp Records and their first with guitarist Douglas Sullivan.

Track listing
All songs written by Mark Lind, except where noted. 
 "Boston, USA" – 1:36
 "Pass You By" – 1:43
 "Alone Tonight" (Lind, Douglas Sullivan) - 1:50
 "Scars" (Lind, Caniris, Rob Lind, Felix Pappalardo) – 3:05
 "Fight" (Lind, Jason Messina) – 1:41
 "For the Underdogs" (Lind, Dan O'Leary) – 2:17
 "Stand By Me" (Ben E. King)  – 2:53
 "Hanging On" – 2:01
 "This Place" – 2:10
 "The Long Road" (Lind, Messina) - 2:21
 "Ain't It a Shame" – 2:15
 "Untitled" – 2:05
 "Break Me" – 2:19
 "Looking Back" (Lind, Sullivan) – 1:34
 "Richmond Skyline" (Lind, Sullivan) - 2:44
 "Crumbling Heart'" (Lind, Messina)- 3:56

Personnel
Band:
 Mark Lind - bass, vocals
 Douglas Sullivan - guitar, vocals
 Jason Messina - drums

Additional Performers:
Zack Brines - organs
James SK Wān - slide whistle

References

2004 albums
The Ducky Boys albums